Orientalium may refer to:

Orientalium Ecclesiarum is the Decree on the Eastern Catholic Churches from the Second Vatican Council
Orientalium dignitas is an 1894 encyclical of Pope Leo XIII
The Pontificium Institutum Orientalium is the premier center for the study of Eastern Christianity in Rome, Italy
The Corpus Scriptorum Christianorum Orientalium is an important bilingual collection of Eastern Christian texts with over 600 volumes published 1903